Robert Alexander Robert Michel Melki (born 14 November 1992), known as Alexander Michel Melki, is a professional footballer who plays as a defender for the Lebanon national team. A centre-back at the club level, Michel Melki is mainly deployed as a right-back at the international level.

Swedish by birth, Michel Melki represented them at youth level before also acquiring Lebanese nationality through his grandfather on his father's side. He decided to switch allegiance to Lebanon and made his senior international debut in 2018. After following his father's tracks playing at Syrianska for six years, Michel Melki moved to AFC Eskilstuna in 2017, helping them gain promotion back to the Allsvenskan the following season. In 2019 he moved to Qatar, joining Al-Khor before moving to Al-Shahania in 2021. Michel Melki returned to AFC Eskilstuna to play the second half of the 2022 season.

Born in Sweden, Michel Melki represented his native country at youth levels before switching allegiance to Lebanon in 2018. He took part in the 2019 AFC Asian Cup, Lebanon's first participation in 19 years.

Early life 
Michel Melki was born in Sweden to a Swedish mother and a Syriac father, Robert Michel, who used to play for Syrianska when the team was still in the lower divisions of Swedish football. He has a younger brother, Felix, who also plays football.

In an interview with TRT World, his brother Felix stated that their grandfather was Lebanese, and that two of their father's sisters were born in Lebanon.

Club career

Syrianska 

Alexander Michel started his career at Syrianska. His personal debut in the first team and in the Allsvenskan took place on 20 June 2011 at the age of 18, with his team being defeated 3–0 against Djurgården. During that season he made a total of 10 league appearances. In 2012 he found further space, with 23 appearances of which 18 as a starter.

Exactly two years after his debut in the Swedish championship, on 20 June 2013 Michel seriously damaged the cruciate ligament of his left knee during a home match against Malmö FF. The injury forced him to stay out of action for a year, with his next official match being played on 25 June 2014 in the Superettan.

Having recovered from the injury, in July 2015 Michel broke the same cruciate ligament damaged two years earlier forcing him to finish the season in advance. His last year at Syrianska was in 2016, with 25 league appearances in the league.

AFC Eskilstuna 
After the expiration of his contract with Syrianska, Michel carried out trials with Hammarby and Djurgården in January 2017. A few weeks later, he signed a two-year contract with Allsveskan side AFC Eskilstuna.

In his first season in the club, Alexander played 23 games in the Allsvenskan coming last in the league. The following season, relegated to the Superettan, he played 29 league games as well as both play-off games to promote his team back to the first division.

Al-Khor
On 23 January 2019, during the winter transfer window, Alkass Sports Channels officially announced the signing of Michel Melki to Qatar Stars League side Al-Khor until the end of the season. In his first season, in 2018–19, Michel Melki played seven league games, and helped his side avoid relegation by finishing 10th in the league.

During the 2019–20 season, Michel Melki played 20 of the 22 regular season games as a starter, missing two games due to injury, and provided two assists. As Al-Khor finished in 11th place, they played the relegation play-off game against Qatari Second Division side Al-Markhiya. They won the encounter 2–0 after extra time, and avoided relegation once again.

Michel Melki finished runner-up with Al-Khor in the 2020–21 Qatar Stars Cup, featuring in the final against eventual winners Al-Rayyan. After playing seven games during the season, his contract was terminated on 20 February 2021.

Al-Shahania 
Michel Melki joined Qatari Second Division side Al-Shahania, making his debut in the 2020–21 season on 27 February 2021, in a 2–0 win against Muaither. After playing five games in the regular season, helping his side finish in second place, Michel Melki played against his former side Al-Khor in the promotion play-offs, losing 3–1 and remaining in the Second Division. He scored his only goal for Al-Shahania on 26 February 2022, during the 2021–22 season, in a 5–1 league win against Al-Waab.

Return to AFC Eskilstuna 
On 8 August 2022, Michel Melki returned to his former club in Sweden AFC Eskilstuna, reuniting with his brother Felix; he signed a contract until the end of the 2022 Superettan season.

International career 

Michel Melki represented Sweden internationally at under-19 and under-21 level.

In 2018, Michel Melki acquired a Lebanese passport due to his origins, making him eligible for the Lebanon national team. He made his international debut for Lebanon on 15 November 2018, playing the whole 90 minutes in a goalless draw against Uzbekistan. Michel Melki was called up for the 2019 AFC Asian Cup, alongside his brother Alexander, one month later.

On his 27th birthday, on 14 November 2019, Michel Melki played the whole 90 minutes in a 2022 FIFA World Cup qualifier match against South Korea. Lebanon held on to a 0–0 draw, with Michel Melki neutralizing Tottenham Hotspur forward Son Heung-min; he was widely regarded as the Man of the Match by Lebanese fans.

Career statistics

Club

International

Honours 
Al-Khor
 Qatari Stars Cup runner-up: 2020–21

See also
 List of Lebanon international footballers born outside Lebanon
 List of association football families

Notes

References

External links

 
 Alexander Michel Melki at Lagstatistik
 

1992 births
Living people
Swedish people of Lebanese descent
Swedish people of Syrian descent
Swedish people of Assyrian/Syriac descent
Lebanese people of Swedish descent
Lebanese people of Syrian descent
Lebanese people of Assyrian descent
Sportspeople of Lebanese descent
Citizens of Lebanon through descent
People from Södertälje
Sportspeople from Stockholm County
Swedish footballers
Lebanese footballers
Assyrian footballers
Association football defenders
Association football central defenders
Association football fullbacks
Syrianska FC players
AFC Eskilstuna players
Al-Khor SC players
Al-Shahania SC players
Allsvenskan players
Superettan players
Qatar Stars League players
Qatari Second Division players
Sweden youth international footballers
Sweden under-21 international footballers
Lebanon international footballers
2019 AFC Asian Cup players
Swedish expatriate footballers
Swedish expatriate sportspeople in Qatar
Lebanese expatriate footballers
Lebanese expatriate sportspeople in Qatar
Expatriate footballers in Qatar